Norman Cameron is the name of:

Norman Cameron (poet) (1905–1953), Scottish poet
Norman Cameron (politician) (1851–1931), Australian politician